Pries is a surname. Notable people with the name Pries include:

Axel Radlach Pries, German physiologist
Ken Pries, American sports broadcaster
Lionel Pries (1897–1968), American architect and artist
Nadja Pries (born 1994), German BMX rider
Rachel Justine Pries, American mathematician

See also
Preis, a surname
Pry (disambiguation)